Coleophora pinii is a moth of the family Coleophoridae. It is found in the lower Volga area in southern Russia.

The larvae feed on Bassia sedoides and Camphorosma monspeliaca.

References

pinii
Moths of Europe
Moths described in 2005